Victor Aleksandrovich Karpenko (born 7 September 1977) is a retired Uzbekistani professional football midfielder, and current coach of FC Bunyodkor.

Career

Club
Karpenko began his playing career with FK Buxoro in 1997, before moving to Qizilqum Zarafshon in 1999.

Bunyodkor
Before joining Bunyodkor in 2007, Karpenko played for several Russian football clubs and in 2005-06 played for FC Kairat. He became one of the leading players and captain of Bunyodkor. Karpenko won 4 championship titles and 3 Uzbek Cups. In 5 seasons he appeared in 202 matches and scored 38 goals for Bunyodkor.

Lokomotiv Tashkent
On 26 January 2013 he signed a contract with Lokomotiv Tashkent.

International
Karpenko made his debut in a friendly against Belarus on 2 April 2003. Since his debut in 2003 Karpenko has been capped in 61 matches and has scored 4 goals for the full Uzbekistan national football team; this includes seven qualifying matches for the 2006 FIFA World Cup and seven qualifying matches for the 2010 FIFA World Cup. On 29 May 2014 he played his farewell match for the national team in a friendly against Oman.

Coaching
After retiring from football Karpenko became a coach at FC Bunyodkor.

Honours

Club
Bunyodkor
Uzbek League (4): 2008, 2009, 2010, 2011
Uzbek Cup (3): 2008, 2010, 2012
AFC Champions League semi-finals (2): 2008, 2012

Lokomotiv
Uzbek Cup (1): 2014
Uzbek League runner-up (1): 2013

References

External links

1977 births
Living people
Uzbekistani people of Ukrainian descent
People from Bukhara
Uzbekistani footballers
Uzbekistan international footballers
FC Shinnik Yaroslavl players
Russian Premier League players
Uzbekistani expatriate footballers
Expatriate footballers in Russia
Uzbekistani expatriate sportspeople in Russia
FC Kairat players
Expatriate footballers in Kazakhstan
Sportspeople from Tashkent
FC Bunyodkor players
FC Sokol Saratov players
Uzbekistani expatriate sportspeople in Kazakhstan
2007 AFC Asian Cup players
2011 AFC Asian Cup players
Buxoro FK players
Association football midfielders
Uzbekistan Super League players
FC Chita players